Two If by Sea (also known in the United Kingdom as Stolen Hearts) is a 1996 American romantic comedy film directed by Bill Bennett, and starring Sandra Bullock and Denis Leary. The screenplay, written by Leary and Mike Armstrong, is based on a story by Leary, Armstrong, and Ann Lembeck.

Plot
Frank O'Brien, a small-time thief, and his 7-year-long girlfriend Roz have stolen a Matisse painting and are bickering in their stolen getaway car as they casually evade a string of police cars pursuing them. 

Told it is worth 100 thousand, they expect to make 10 thousand upon delivering it in two days. Hearing a train, they ditch the car for Amtrak, but it doesn't take long for the police to catch up. So Frank and Roz jump a ferry to Rhode Island, where they are meant to deliver the painting.

Finding out a family is away through the weekend, they let themselves in. Soon afterward the neighbor Evan Marsh pops by, and Roz skillfully weaves a lie, dropping the names of the homeowner's son based on a postcard she saw. At ease, Evan invites them to a party the next evening.

That evening the couple are relaxing, and Roz finds the stolen painting featured in a book of art. Soon thereafter they argue over another job Frank's meant to do the following week, as he'd promised to start to earn a living to put an end to their unsteady lifestyle and just do that last job.

As Roz kicked Frank out of the bedroom, he wakes on the sofa to a local law enforcement officer. Todd, a nearby teen, had contacted the station, reporting suspicious behaviour. The couple starts to answer, when Evan waltzes in and vouches for them. 

At Evan's party, Roz is successfully trying to blend, while an uncomfortable Frank tags along. He had been trying to dissuade her from going, mistrustful of Evan, and uncomfortable with the high society types there. Tired of Frank spoiling Roz's attempt to interact, she stomps away from the party. She tells him she needs to move on, as their relationship is not advancing as she needs.

The next day, Roz tries out painting, as well as spends the day with Evan. They ride horses and he openly expresses his interest. Meanwhile, Todd shows Frank his footage of various neighbors. He brags that he has grabbed lots of great shots he could use as blackmail. 

On Sunday morning, while Roz is spending time with Evan he kisses her, making her uncomfortable. Meanwhile, Frank realises that he's seen footage from Evan's of another missing Matisse in his home, realising he is an art thief. 

When the FBI swarm in to bust the couple for the Matisse, Frank leads them to Evans', where several extremely valuable paintings are found. Roz and Frank make up after he promises to clean up his act and settle down.

Cast
 Sandra Bullock as Roz
 Denis Leary as Francis "Frank" O'Brien
 Stephen Dillane as Evan Marsh
 Yaphet Kotto as FBI Agent O'Malley
 Mike Starr as "Fitzie"
 Jonathan Tucker as Todd
 Wayne Robson as Beano Callahan
 Michael Badalucco as Quinn
 Lenny Clarke as Kelly

Production
The film was shot in locales including Chester, Lunenburg, Mahone Bay, and Riverport, Nova Scotia.

Release

Box office
Two If by Sea opened theatrically on January 12, 1996 in 1,712 venues, grossing $4,656,986 in the United States and Canada, ranking tenth for its opening weekend. At the end of its run, the film grossed $10,658,278 in the United States and Canada and an estimated $10 million internationally for a worldwide total of $21 million.

The film was Sandra Bullock's worst wide opening up until 2015, when Our Brand Is Crisis released in October, earning $3,238,433 in its first weekend.

Critical reception
The film received negative reviews from critics. On Rotten Tomatoes the film has an approval rating of 13% based on reviews from 30 critics, with an average rating of 3.9/10.

Variety wrote: "It could have been a recipe for antic fun, but the couple’s quarrelsome nature is grating, the cops are needlessly inept, the boy provides a misplaced element of creaky sentimentality, and the goons debase the hallowed cinema ground of petty crime."
Entertainment Weekly gave it a D.

Denis Leary said it was "one of the funniest scripts he had ever read" and blamed director Bill Bennett for the film's failure, saying "he destroyed it."

References

External links
 
 
 
 
 

1996 films
1990s crime comedy films
1996 romantic comedy films
American crime comedy films
American romantic comedy films
1990s English-language films
Films about the Federal Bureau of Investigation
Films scored by Nick Glennie-Smith
Films directed by Bill Bennett
Films shot in Nova Scotia
Morgan Creek Productions films
Films about theft
1990s American films